Steve, Steven or Stephen Sanders may refer to:

 Steve Sanders (American football) (born 1982), American wide receiver
 Steve Sanders (90210), fictional American television drama Beverly Hills, 90210 character
 Steve Sanders (footballer) (born 1978), English footballer
 Steve Sanders (musician) (1952–1998), vocalist and guitarist for The Oak Ridge Boys
 Steve Sanders (karate) (born 1939)
 Steven 'gaze' Sanders (born 1976), Belgian guitarist for Spoil Engine
 Stephen Sanders, an alias used by the fictional character Doctor Strange

See also
Stephen Saunders (disambiguation)